The Broken Tour was the debut concert tour by German recording artist Kim Petras in support of her first studio album Clarity (2019). The tour was announced by Petras via her social media accounts on April 30, 2019. It started on 11 June 2019 in Nashville, United States and concluded on 4 September 2019 in Cologne, Germany.

Background and development 
When announced on April 30, 2019, the tour was scheduled to comprise ten North American shows in June and to conclude on 26 June 2019 in San Francisco, United States. It was initially considered to be in support of Petras' single "Broken", as her debut album had not been officially announced yet.

On 2 May 2019 additional shows in San Francisco and Los Angeles were announced. The following day Petras disclosed that both shows in Los Angeles as well as the shows in New York and Chicago were sold out. On 7 May 2019, a week after the initial tour announcement, all shows with the exception of Atlanta, Washington and the added San Francisco show were sold out.

On 13 May 2019 Petras announced that a European leg of the tour, comprising additional shows in the United Kingdom, France, the Netherlands and Germany, had been added. Thus, the tour would encompass 20 shows, including 17 solo shows as well as 3 festival appearance in the United Kingdom on the 23, 24 and 25 of August 2019. Due to high demand several venues for the European leg had to be upgraded.

On 31 May 2019 Petras revealed that rehearsals for the tour had started.

Set list 
This set list is representative of the European leg of the tour and the performance on September 4, 2019. Due to starting before the entirety of Clarity had been released, the set list varied greatly for the duration of the tour. Song titles adapted from Spotify.

{{Div col|content=;Act I
"Got My Number"
"Hillside Boys"
"Hills"
"Blow It All"
"Broken"
"Icy"

Act II
"Omen" 
"Close Your Eyes"
"Personal Hell"
"In the Next Life"
"Boo! Bitch!" 
Act III
"If U Think About Me ..."
"Do Me"
"All the Time"
"1, 2, 3 Dayz Up"
"I Don't Want It at All"
"Unlock It"
Encore
"Can't Do Better"
"Heart to Break"
"Sweet Spot"}}

Tour dates

Reception 
Most shows of the North American leg were sold out. Further, many had to move to bigger venues due to high demand. Similarly, most shows of the European leg were also sold out or had to move to bigger venues in order to accommodate the demand.

The tour was generally very well received. Rae Lemeshow-Barooshian of Play Too Much praised it as a "euphoric pop rendezvous" and called it "an explosion of joy" whenever Petras took the stage. Michiel Vos of A Bit of Pop Music compared Petras' stage outfits and styling to "Lady Gaga's looks during her The Fame era" and attested that Petras looked "like an absolute star when dancing and posing". He further stated that Petras commands "a mesmerizing star quality" and would also hold her own vocally, even though oftentimes singing along to a backing track. Writing for Atwood Magazine, Nicole Almeida also stressed Petras' star quality, calling the tour the "perfect demonstration of Petras' star power". She further referred to the concert as "more than a show", but a "visual representation of Kim Petras' career" and concluded that she witnessed "a night of transcendental joy, pride, celebration, and fun". In his review of the first stop of the European leg, Alex Rigotti of Gigwise especially praised Petras' self-awareness in regards to "how ridiculous pop is". He identified the show to follow a structure in accordance with Petras' body of work. Thus, he referred to act I as a representation of heartbreak from her debut record, Clarity, the second act as being representative of her Halloween-themed extended play (EP), Turn Off the Light, Vol. 1, and the third act as being "about the ecstasy of falling in love from her Era 1 days". Even though the staging was "stripped down and simple", he declared it to be "effective" through "being fuelled by the charm of the singer feeling her fantasy".

References 

2019 concert tours